Marc Vincent Trudeau (born May 20, 1957) is an American prelate of the Roman Catholic Church, serving as an auxiliary bishop for the Archdiocese of Los Angeles in California since 2018.

Biography

Early life 
Marc Trudeau was born on May 20, 1957, in Hollywood. California to Paul and Belva Trudeau.  Paul was a naturalized American citizen of French-Canadian descent and Belva came from Illinois. Marc Trudeau attended primary school and high school in Burbank, California, then in 1981 entered the University of Southern California in Los Angeles.  After graduating in 1985 with a Bachelor of Science degree in Biological Sciences, Trudeau continued with dental school at the University of Southern California in Los Angeles. After a short period practicing dentistry, Trudeau decided to enter the priesthood. He entered Saint John's Seminary in Camarillo, California in 1986, studying philosophy and then theology until 1991.

Priesthood 
On August 6, 1991, Trudeau was ordained to the priesthood for the Archdiocese of Los Angeles by Archbishop José Gómez. After his ordination, Trudeau served at two parishes in Southern California: as parochial vicar at St. James the Less in La Crescenta; and then as parochial vicar and temporary administrator at St. Philip the Apostle in Pasadena. He was appointed pastor of St. Pius X Parish in Santa Fe Springs, California in 2001.  In 2008, Trudeau was diagnosed with lymphoma;  he would undergo radiation therapy and chemotherapy for the next three years.

After leaving Santa Fe Springs, Trudeau moved to the Cathedral of Our Lady of the Angels to be secretary to the archbishop, a position held for six years.  In 2013, Trudeau was named as a vicar forane for the archdiocese and then in 2014 was appointed rector of Saint John's Seminary.  His last pastoral assignment before being named auxiliary bishop was at St. Mary Margaret Alacoque Parish in Lomita, California.

Auxiliary Bishop of Los Angeles
Pope Francis appointed Trudeau as an auxiliary bishop for the Archdiocese of Los Angeles and titular bishop of Tinisa di Proconsolare on April 5, 2018. On June 7, 2018, he was consecrated as a bishop by Gómez.

See also

 Catholic Church hierarchy
 Catholic Church in the United States
 Historical list of the Catholic bishops of the United States
 List of Catholic bishops of the United States
 Lists of patriarchs, archbishops, and bishops

References

External links
Roman Catholic Archdiocese of Los Angeles Official Site

 

1957 births
Living people
People from Hollywood, Los Angeles
21st-century Roman Catholic bishops in the United States
Bishops appointed by Pope Francis